Samares Mazumdar (born 10 March 1944) is an Indian Bengali writer from West Bengal, India. He is best known for his Animesh series of novels, the second of which (Kalbela) won the Sahitya Akademi Award in 1984. He is also known for creating the detective character Arjun, who is the central character of the 2013 film Arjun – Kalimpong E Sitaharan. The Bengali film Buno Haansh, which released on 15 August 2014, is also based on his novel of the same name, which was published in Pujabarshiki Anondolok.

Early life and education
Mazumdar spent his childhood years in the tea gardens of Dooars, Gairkata in Jalpaiguri district, West Bengal, India. He was a student of the Jalpaiguri Zilla School, Jalpaiguri. He completed his bachelor's degree in Bengali literature from Scottish Church College in Kolkata. Followed by a Master's in Bengali Literature from University of Calcutta. His first story appeared in Desh literary magazine in 1967. Dour ("Run") was his first novel, which was published in Desh in 1976. He was associated with the Ananda Bazar Prakashana, a major publishing house in Calcutta.

Genre 

Mazumdar is a versatile writer though many of his novels have a touch of thrill and suspense attached to them. His novels include Aath Kuthuri Noy Daraja, Bandinibash, Daybadhha, and Buno Haansher Palak. Perhaps his most famous novel is Saatkahon. Being a prolific writer who has excelled in different genres, Samares Mazumdar has worked on short stories, novels, travelogues and children's fiction. His quartet of Uttoradhikar, Kalbela  Kalpurush and " Mousalkal" is now considered as a modern classic.

Famous characters
 Animesh and Madhabilata (Uttaradhikar, Kaalbela, Kalpurush and Mousholkaal)
 Arjun - the sleuth cum science fiction character. The first movie based upon the early adventures of Arjun is Arjun — Kalimpong E Sitaharan, released on 3 May 2013.
 Dipaboli, a striking main character of Saatkahon
 Arka - son of Animesh; in Kalpurush and Moushalkal

Works

 Dour
 Uttaradhikar
 Kaalbela
 Kalpurush
 Mousholkal
 Garbhodharini
 Aattiyoswajan
 Ani
 Harinbari
 Janajajok
 Boro Paap Hey
 Ujangonga
 Lokkhir Pachali
 Showar
 Unish Bish
 Shatkahon
 Aabash
 Shoronagoto
 Ferari
 Din Jay Rat Jay
 Bondinibash
 Buno Haansh
 Nikotkotha
 Sroddhanjali
 Anuprobesh
 Kulokundolini
 Ora ebong oder maayera
 Haaramir haatbaksho
 Takapoysa
 Ei ami renu
 Teerthojaatri
 Bile paani nei
 Panchti Rohosyo Uponyas
 Kosto Kosto Sukh
 Istition
 Manusher Ma
 Buker bhetor Bangladesh
 Dow Dow Agun
 Kathkoilar Agun
 Kolikatay Nabakumar
 Calcuttay Nabakumar
 Filmstar Nabakumar

Works for younger audiences

Awards

 Banga Bibhushan Samman - 2018 awarded by Government of West Bengal
 Sera Bangali - 2018
Bankim Puroshkar - 2009 for Kolikataye Nobokumar
 Sahitya Akademi Award - 1984 for Kalbela
 Ananda Purashkar - 1982
 Bengal Film Journalists' Association Award, Dishari and Chalachchitra Prasar Samity - Best Script Writer - 1982

References

External links

Living people
1944 births
People from Jalpaiguri district
Bengali-language writers
Bengali writers
Indian children's writers
Bengali detective fiction writers
Scottish Church College alumni
University of Calcutta alumni
Recipients of the Ananda Purashkar
Recipients of the Sahitya Akademi Award in Bengali
20th-century Indian novelists
Novelists from West Bengal